Vlkoš may refer to the following localities:
 Vlkoš (Hodonín District), a village in Hodonín District, Czech Republic
 Vlkoš (Přerov District), a village in Přerov District, Czech Republic